The Buddenbrooks is a 1959 West German drama film directed by Alfred Weidenmann and starring Liselotte Pulver, Hansjörg Felmy, Nadja Tiller. It was released in two parts. It is an adaptation of the 1901 novel of the same name by Thomas Mann.

The art director Robert Herlth designed the film's sets. It was filmed at the Wandsbek Studios. Location shooting took place in Hamburg and Lübeck.

Main cast
 Hansjörg Felmy as Thomas Buddenbrook
 Liselotte Pulver as Antonia "Tony" Buddenbrook / Grünlich
 Nadja Tiller as Gerda Arnoldsen / Buddenbrook
 Hanns Lothar as Christian Buddenbrook
 Lil Dagover as Elisabeth Buddenbrook
 Werner Hinz as Jean Buddenbrook
 Rudolf Platte as Herr Wenzel
 Günther Lüders as Corle Smolt
 Robert Graf as Bendix Grünlich
 Wolfgang Wahl as Hermann Hagenström
 Gustav Knuth as Diederich Schwarzkopf
 Joseph Offenbach as Bankier Kesselmeyer
 Paul Hartmann as Pastor Kölling
 Hans Leibelt as Dr. Friedrich Grabow
 Carsta Löck as Ida Jungmann
 Ellen Roedler as Anna
 Hela Gruel as Sesemi Weichbrodt
 Hans Paetsch as Arnoldsen
 Horst Janson as Morten Schwarzkopf
 Fritz Schmiedel as Sigismund Gosch
 Karl Ludwig Lindt as Friedrich Wilhelm Marcus
 Frank Freytag as Sievert Tiburtius
 Gustl Halenke as Clara Buddenbrook
 Helga Feddersen as Clothilde Buddenbrook

References

Bibliography 
 Geoffrey Nowell-Smith. The Oxford History of World Cinema. Oxford University Press, 1997.

External links 
 
 

1959 films
1950s historical drama films
German epic films
German historical drama films
West German films
1950s German-language films
Films directed by Alfred Weidenmann
Films based on works by Thomas Mann
Films based on German novels
Remakes of German films
Films set in the 1840s
Films set in the 1850s
Films set in the 1860s
Films set in the 1870s
Films about businesspeople
Films about families
Films shot at Wandsbek Studios
Films released in separate parts
1959 drama films
1950s German films